Dialogo de Cecco di Ronchitti da Bruzene in perpuosito de la stella Nuova (Dialogue of Cecco di Ronchitti of Brugine concerning the New star) is the title of an early 17th-century pseudonymous pamphlet ridiculing the views of an aspiring  Aristotelian philosopher, Antonio Lorenzini da Montepulciano, on the nature and properties of Kepler's Supernova, which had appeared in October 1604.  The pseudonymous Dialogue was written in the coarse language of a rustic Paduan dialect, and first published in about March, 1605, in Padua.   A second edition was published later the same year in Verona. Antonio Favaro republished the contents of the pamphlet in its original language in 1881, with annotations and a commentary in Italian. He republished it again in Volume 2 of the National Edition of Galileo's works in 1891, along with a translation into standard Italian. An English translation was published by Stillman Drake in 1976.

Scholars agree that the pamphlet was written either by Galileo Galilei or one of his followers, Girolamo Spinelli, or by both in collaboration, but do not agree on the extent of the contribution—if any—made by each of them to its composition.

Footnotes

Bibliography

1605 books
Astronomy pamphlets
Historical physics publications
History of astronomy
1605 in science
Philosophy of science books